Uganda competed in the 2003 All-Africa Games which took place at the National Stadium in the city of Abuja, Nigeria. Uganda sent a substantial delegation and entered thirty three events, some, like the women’s 100 and 200 metres, with more than one competitor. The team won five medals and came twenty-sixth in the final medal table. Dorcus Inzikuru won a silver medal in the women’s 5000 metres. The individual bronze medals were won by Ajambo Irene in weightlifting and the boxing team of Jolly Kotongole and Sadat Tebazalwa. In team events, the Ugandan women’s team were awarded a bronze medal in softball.

Competitors
Uganda entered thirty-three events, twenty-one for men and twelve for women. Amongst the team events, the baseball team came fourth, an improvement on their sixth position at the previous games. Allan Otim was the tournament leader in steals. In the individual events, Boniface Toroitich Kiprop, Dorcus Inzikuru, Justine Bayiga and Veronica Wabukawo all took part in two races. Bayiga and Wabukawo ran against each other in the 100 and 200 metres. Kiprop entered both the 10000 and 5000 metres, while Inzikuru participated in both 5000 and 800 metres. Olympian Paskar Owor entered the  800 metres. Jolly Kotongole and Sadat Tebazalwa competed in the boxing tournament. However, they were almost barred from entering due to non-payment of affiliation fees. Only the actions of Ugandan boxing official Sande Musoke enabled the bouts to happen when he surrendered his allowances to cover the costs.

Medal summary
Uganda won five medals, a silver and four bronze medals, and was ranked twenty-sixth in the final medal table.

Medal table

List of Medalists

Silver Medal

Bronze Medal

See also
 Uganda at the African Games

References

2003 in Ugandan sport
Nations at the 2003 All-Africa Games
2003